Aces High is a 1976 war film starring Malcolm McDowell, Peter Firth, Christopher Plummer and Simon Ward. The film, which is an Anglo-French production, is based on the 1928 play Journey's End by R. C. Sherriff with additional material from the memoir Sagittarius Rising by Cecil Lewis. It was directed by Jack Gold. The screenplay was written by Howard Barker.

Aces High turns the trench warfare of Journey's End into the aerial battles fought above the Western Front by the Royal Flying Corps (RFC) in 1917. The film covers a week of a squadron where the high death rate puts an enormous strain on the surviving pilots. Many characters and plot lines are loosely based on those of Journey's End: the idealistic new officer who is killed at the end, and whose sister is the girlfriend of his tough but alcoholic commanding officer, the kindly middle-aged second-in-command (known as "Uncle" by the younger officers) who is killed on a dangerous intelligence-gathering mission ordered by the top brass, and the officer whose claims of neuralgia are taken to be cowardice.

Plot
In October 1916, fighter ace John Gresham (Malcolm McDowell) speaks to the senior class at Eton College. A year later, new recruit, 2nd Lt. Croft (Peter Firth), arrives at Gresham's temporary base in northern France. Gresham had been his house captain at Eton and is also the boyfriend of Croft's older sister.

Gresham relies on alcohol to continue flying because of severe combat stress. Faced with being responsible for the safety of Croft (and the potential impact his loss would have on his sister), Gresham drinks even more heavily. Croft is forced to learn quickly on how to survive - both in the air and on the ground - because aerial combat and squadron etiquette are both merciless. In his week-long rite of passage from naive schoolboy to military pilot, his youthful adoration of Gresham is replaced with respect as he comes to understand the severe strain endured by his commanding officer.

By the end of the week, Croft seems to have acquired the necessary combat skills when he shoots down his first plane. However, he is suddenly killed in an air-to-air collision with a German aircraft. Back at base, Gresham sees an apparition of an uninjured, smiling Croft through his office window. After the image fades, Gresham orders the next young replacement pilots to be brought in for his inspection.

Cast
(Name in brackets for the equivalent character in Journey's End.)

Production

Development
The idea for the film came from producer Benny Fisz, who had served in the RAF in the Second World War, who pitched the idea of remaking Journey's End to British director Jack Gold. Although initially wary of it being an aviation film, Gold agreed after Howard Barker revised the screenplay. Gold said he was attracted to the film because "That was innocence, extreme youth, marred lives of these pilots who knew they are going to die. And we could show not only chivalry  and bravery but also the fear." "What interests me is human relationships," said Gold. "Aces High has aerial battle scenes but they're not just thrown in. It has songs but they're not just cue music. They do tell something about the characters."

The movie was co-financed by EMI Films.

Casting
Peter Firth and Christopher Plummer joined Malcolm McDowell, who agreed to appear in the film because Gold had such a good reputation among actors at the time.

Filming
The shooting schedule took seven weeks with one week for rehearsal. Exteriors were shot in Spain and Southern England with principal photography at Booker Airfield, High Wycombe, Buckinghamshire, as well as St Katharine Docks and Eton College. Interiors were completed at Pinewood Studios.

The production paid close attention to authenticity with First World War era equipment being used throughout the film such as the airfield facilities, barracks and motor transport. The depicted squadron (known as 76 Squadron) is loosely based on 56 Squadron, which flew the S.E.5 that regained Allied air superiority in mid 1917.

Some scenes are based on real RFC stories, such as pilots choosing between jumping to their deaths or burning alive in their aircraft (as they were not issued parachutes). The juvenile mess room songs and young pilots "public school" attitudes capture the fatalistic attitudes of the time, when the life expectancy of a new pilot could be measured in weeks.

Aerial sequences

Although the film reused some aerial sequences from The Blue Max (1966) and  Von Richthofen and Brown (1971), the producers shot their own flight scenes. All British S.E.5s were heavily modified Stampe SV.4s, a Belgian two-seat trainer that first flew in the 1930s. Sinclair's plane was a period Avro 504.

German aircraft were all adapted post-WWI aircraft except for a replica Fokker E-III . The reproduction is seen when it is brought down intact and its pilot given a toast by his British counterparts. Production stills show Malcolm McDowell (Gresham) posing with a Bristol M.1C but this particular plane does not appear in the finished film.

Director Jack Gold later recalled "It was very difficult to obtain those planes. Sometimes we used models or archive footage. Action sequences in the air were very difficult to make and they were also very much tied with story. I had great assistant in Derek Cracknell and great specialist for special effects."

Release
The film was not shown in US cinemas. HBO premiered it in 1979.

Reception
Film historian Michael Paris saw Aces High as another of the period films that attempted to "de-mystologise" warfare. Film archivist and historian Stephen Pendo saw the "good aerial photography by Gerry Fisher" as the strength of a film that played more as "standard fare".

Legacy
The song "Aces High" by Iron Maiden is named after and inspired by the film, although takes place during the Second World War, whereas the film takes place in the First World War. Iron Maiden frequently name songs after war films.

The episode of Blackadder Goes Forth titled "Private Plane", during the aerial sequence, reuses scenes from Aces High.

References

Notes

Citations

Bibliography

 Beck, Simon D. The Aircraft Spotter's Film and Television Companion. Jefferson, North Carolina, 2016. .
 Carlson, Mark. Flying on Film: A Century of Aviation in the Movies, 1912–2012. Duncan, Oklahoma: BearManor Media, 2012. .
 Orriss, Bruce W. When Hollywood Ruled the Skies: The Aviation Film Classics of World War I. Los Angeles: Aero Associates, 2013. .
 Paris, Michael. From the Wright Brothers to Top gun: Aviation, Nationalism, and Popular Cinema. Manchester, UK: Manchester University Press, 1995. .
 Pendo, Stephen. Aviation in the Cinema. Lanham, Maryland: Scarecrow Press, 1985. .

External links
 
 
 allmovie/synopsis

1976 films
British war films
Films about the Royal Air Force
World War I aviation films
World War I films based on actual events
Films directed by Jack Gold
Western Front (World War I) films
EMI Films films
Films shot at EMI-Elstree Studios
1970s English-language films
1970s British films